Brickworks (also known as Bukit Batok West Extension) is a subzone of Bukit Batok, Singapore. It is bounded by Bukit Batok West Avenue 3/2/5 and Bukit Batok Road and is beside the upcoming New Town, Tengah. It is the latest development area in Bukit Batok.

Public & Private housing 

In recent years, several new HDB developments have been launched in the area.

Commercial and Recreation facilities 
A commercial and private residential development known as Le Quest was opened in October 2020, serving as a neighborhood centre. A new hawker centre will be built beside Le Quest. Bukit Batok Hillside Park is also in this area.

Transportation 
There are few bus services passing through Bukit Batok West Extension such as 991, 941 and 944. 160M will also be launched in July 2020. The area will also be served by the upcoming Jurong Region Line.

Healthcare and Education Amenities
There are also more amenities that can be found in the area of Bukit Batok West Extension.

Politics
It is part of Hong Kah North Single Member Constituency, itself a division of the former Hong Kah Group Representation Constituency.

Neighbouring areas

References

Places in Singapore
Bukit Batok